The olive-backed sunbird (Cinnyris jugularis), also known as the yellow-bellied sunbird, is a species of sunbird found from Southern Asia to Australia.

Taxonomy
In 1760 the French zoologist Mathurin Jacques Brisson included a description of the olive-backed sunbird in his Ornithologie based on a specimen collected in the Philippines. He used the French name Le petit grimpereau des Philippines and the Latin Certhia Philippensis Minor. Although Brisson coined Latin names, these do not conform to the binomial system and are not recognised by the International Commission on Zoological Nomenclature. When in 1766 the Swedish naturalist Carl Linnaeus updated his Systema Naturae for the twelfth edition, he added 240 species that had been previously described by Brisson. One of these was the olive-backed sunbird. Linnaeus included a brief description, coined the binomial name Certhia jugularis and cited Brisson's work. The specific name jugularis is Medieval Latin for 'of the throat'. This species is now placed in the genus Cinnyris that was introduced by the French naturalist Georges Cuvier in 1816. Currently, there are 21 subspecies described, but there is a growing body of evidence to suggest these subspecies may represent multiple cryptic species.

Description
In most subspecies, the underparts of both male and female are bright yellow, the backs are a dull brown colour. The forehead, throat and upper breast of the adult male is a dark, metallic blue-black. In the Philippines the males of some subspecies have an orange band on the chest, in Wallacea and northern New Guinea some subspecies have most of the underparts blackish, and in southern China and adjacent parts of Vietnam most of the underparts of the male are greyish-white.

Distribution and habitat
The olive-backed sunbird is common across southern China and Southeast Asia to Queensland and the Solomon Islands. Originally from mangrove habitat, the olive-backed sunbird has adapted well to humans, and is now common even in fairly densely populated areas, even forming their nests in human dwellings.

Behaviour

Breeding
The birds mate between the months of April and August in the Northern Hemisphere, and between August and January in the Southern Hemisphere. Both the male and the female assist in building the nest which is flask-shaped, with an overhanging porch at the entrance, and a trail of hanging material at the bottom end.

After building the nest, the birds abandon the nest for about a week before the female returns to lay one or two greenish-blue eggs. The eggs take 2 weeks to hatch. The female may leave the nest for short periods during the day during incubation. After the chicks have hatched, both male and female assist in the care of the young, which leave the nest about two or three weeks later.

Feeding
The sunbirds are a group of very small Old World passerine birds which feed largely on nectar, although they will also take insects, especially when feeding young. Their flight is fast and direct on their short wings. Most species can take nectar by hovering, but usually perch to feed most of the time.

Gallery

References

 Sunbirds by Cheke, Mann and Allen,

External links
Olive-backed sunbird videos, photos & sounds on the Internet Bird Collection.
 BirdLife Species Factsheet
Yellow-bellied sunbird video
Images of female and chicks in nest

olive-backed sunbird
Birds of South China
Birds of Singapore
Birds of Southeast Asia
Birds of New Guinea
Birds of the Solomon Islands
Birds of Queensland
olive-backed sunbird
olive-backed sunbird